The Thing is the eighth album by The Jazz Crusaders recorded in 1965 and released on the Pacific Jazz label.

Reception

AllMusic rated the album with 3 stars.

Track listing 
 "The Thing" (Joe Sample) - 4:40
 "Sunset in Mountains" (Wayne Henderson) - 5:10
 "While the City Sleeps" (Charles Strouse, Lee Adams) - 3:35
 "White Cobra" (Sample) - 4:45
 "New Time Shuffle" (Sample) - 4:40
 "Para Mi Espoza" (Stix Hooper) - 6:40
 "Soul Kosher" (Wilton Felder) - 5:35

Personnel 
The Jazz Crusaders
Wayne Henderson - trombone
Wilton Felder - tenor saxophone
Joe Sample - piano
Monk Montgomery - bass (tracks 2, 3, 6 & 7)
Victor Gaskin  - bass (tracks 1, 4 & 5)
Stix Hooper - drums

References 

The Jazz Crusaders albums
1963 albums
Pacific Jazz Records albums